USS Topeka (SSN-754) is a  and the third United States Navy vessel to be named for Topeka, Kansas. The contract to build her was awarded to the Electric Boat Division of General Dynamics Corporation in Groton, Connecticut, on 28 November 1983 and her keel was laid down on 13 May 1986. She was launched on 23 January 1988, sponsored by Elizabeth Dole, and commissioned on 21 October 1989.

Topeka and  form a unique variant among Los Angeles class submarines. The pressure hulls of both ships were partially manufactured using stronger HY-100, instead of the HY-80 steel used in the manufacturing of all other Los Angeles class submarines. This was done to test construction methods using this steel, which would later be employed in the assembly of the new s. In theory, this permits Albany and Topeka to dive to a slightly greater depth than any other member of the Los Angeles class, though it remains unclear if this ability has ever been tested by either vessel.

History 
During New Year's Eve 2000, Topeka straddled the international dateline, thus was famously "in two millenniums at once".

In October 2002, after completing a Modernization Period in Pearl Harbor Naval Shipyard, Topeka shifted homeport to San Diego, California, from Pearl Harbor.

In December 2012, the submarine began an overhaul at Portsmouth Naval Shipyard. Earlier that same year, she completed a six-month-long deployment in the Western Pacific, covering around 35,000 nautical miles.

In May 2015, after miscellaneous repairs at Pearl Harbor Naval Shipyard, Topeka shifted homeport to Naval Base Guam as part of the U.S. Navy's rebalance of force into the Pacific.

In December 2020, Topeka shifted homeport to Naval Station Pearl Harbor.

Topeka participated in RIMPAC 2022.

Awards 

COMSUBRON 11 Battle "E" - 1993/1995
In August 2004, Topeka returned to San Diego after six months of operations with the Seventh Fleet, including three missions significant to national security that earned the boat the Navy Expeditionary Medal and Navy Unit Commendation Medal. The ship and crew earned the Battle Efficiency "E" Award for 2004, 2005, 2007, 2008, 2009, 2016, and 2021.

Popular culture

In the 2009 live-action movie Transformers: Revenge of the Fallen, Topeka was part of a Carrier Battle Group stationed permanently in the Laurentian Abyss to guard the dumping site of Megatron. When several Decepticons arrived and dived to reach Megatron, the submarine spotted them and set off in pursuit.
 Topeka is also featured in TV series 24 in season 5 when terrorists intend to use her weapons against civilians in Los Angeles. 
She was featured as the "lost" submarine in the series Surface
Topeka was also featured in the documentary series Submarines: Sharks of Steel.

References

 

Los Angeles-class submarines
Cold War submarines of the United States
Nuclear submarines of the United States Navy
Ships built in Groton, Connecticut
1988 ships
Submarines of the United States